Adolphe Beaufrère (March 24, 1876 in Quimper – February 16, 1960 in Larmor-Plage) was a French painter, illustrator, and engraver.

Beaufrère joined the École nationale supérieure des Beaux-Arts in Paris in 1897 where he studied under Gustave Moreau and Fernand Cormon. Besides painting, he also worked in printmaking. His first exhibition was in 1898 at the Salon. In 1911, a scholarship enabled him to travel to Algeria, Italy and Spain. During the First World War, he served in the infantry. In 1922, he decided to settle permanently in Larmor-Plage. He primarily used etching and drypoint, with some attempts at woodcut.

In 1949, he illustrated Forest Voisine Mauritius Genevoix (Contemporary Books, 1949).

References
 Elizabeth Cazenave: "Les Artistes de l'Algérie", Bernard Giovanangeli Publisher, 2001, 
 Elizabeth Cazenave, "La Villa Abd E TIF, Un half century of life artistique en Algérie 1907-1962", Abd El TIF Association, 1998, 
 Jean-magnifiers April, Bretton Mille, biographique dictionary, Saint-Jacques-de-la-Lande, 2002,
 Gerald Schurr et Pierre Cabana: "Dictionnaire des Petits Maitres de la Painting 1820-1920", 2003, Les Editions de l'Amateur, .
 Peintres des Cotes de Bretagne, tome 5, Leo Kerlo et Jacqueline Duroc, Editions CHASSE-marée, Douarnenez 2007, 
 Daniel Morane, Beaufrère, catalog raisonné de l'œuvre engraved, Concarneau 1981

External links
Exhibition of Etchings, an exhibition catalog containing a list of works by Beaufrère, available from the Metropolitan Museum of Art Libraries.

1876 births
1960 deaths
French illustrators